Cheikh Sarr was a Senegalese immigrant to Italy that died on Saturday August 21, 2004 while rescuing a swimmer from drowning in the ocean outside the beach at Marina di Castagneto, near Livorno. Sarr, who was 27 years old the day of his heroic deed, was posthumously awarded Italy's highest civilian honour for bravery.

Year of birth missing
2004 deaths
Senegalese emigrants to Italy